Tsamakasar is a village in the Talin Municipality of the Aragatsotn Province of Armenia. The town is the site of Bronze Age burials being excavated.

References 

Populated places in Aragatsotn Province